Kohlhiesel's Daughters (German:Kohlhiesels Töchter) may refer to:

 Kohlhiesel's Daughters (play), a play by Hanns Kräly
 Kohlhiesel's Daughters (1920 film), a 1920 silent German film directed by Ernst Lubitsch 
 Kohlhiesel's Daughters (1930 film), a 1930 German film directed by Hans Behrendt
 Kohlhiesel's Daughters (1943 film), a 1943 German film directed by Kurt Hoffmann 
 Kohlhiesel's Daughters (1962 film), a 1962 West German film directed by Axel von Ambesser